Agha Sabir (born 8 April 1981) is a Pakistani first-class cricketer who has been part of Pakistan domestic cricket since 2001. Agha Sabir started his first-class career for Pakistan Customs. In 2005, Agha Sabir was recruited by Pakistan International Airlines as a professional cricketer.

Early career
Agha made his first-class debut in 2001 at the age of 20. Pakistan Customs selected him for the PCB Patron's Trophy in 2001. Agha scored his maiden first-class century against Pakistan International Airlines in his second game. He ended up scoring 196 in first innings with twenty-one fours and six sixes.

After his performance in the Patron's Trophy 2001/02, he was selected for Karachi region to participate in the Quaid-e-Azam Trophy, scoring 154.

Agha continued to make his name and represented Pakistan Academy Team against South Africa during its tour to Pakistan in 2005 and PCB XI against the touring Leicestershire County Team in 2005.

Professional career

Professional awards

References

External links
 

1981 births
Living people
Pakistani cricketers
Karachi cricketers
Cricketers from Karachi
Defence Housing Authority cricketers